Hangin' with Mr. Cooper is an American television sitcom that originally aired on ABC from September 22, 1992, to August 30, 1997, starring Mark Curry and Holly Robinson. The show took place in Curry's hometown of Oakland, California. The series chronicles Mark Cooper (Curry), an NBA player-turned-substitute teacher/gym coach (and later basketball coach), and his roommate (later girlfriend, then fiancée) Vanessa (Robinson).

Hangin' with Mr. Cooper was produced by Jeff Franklin Productions, in association with Warner Bros. Television, having been produced by Lorimar Television for the first season before being absorbed, and also became produced by Bickley-Warren Productions by the third season. The show originally aired on Tuesdays in prime time after sister series Full House, also created by Jeff Franklin and set in the San Francisco Bay Area. The show found its niche as an addition to the TGIF Friday night lineup on ABC, and was part of the lineup from September 1993 to May 1996 (spanning the show's second, third and fourth seasons before moving to Saturdays for its fifth and final season).

Cast

Main
Mark Cooper (Mark Curry) – (Season one stated) Golden State Warriors turned high school teacher and PE teacher for Oakbridge High School; later became interim head coach for the Oakbridge boys' basketball team, but was originally passed over for permanent coach after being offered the job by P.J. Moore in season 3; later begins dating (and then almost immediately engaged to) roommate Vanessa Russell by the end of season four, though there are hints in season one that he is interested in her
Vanessa Russell (Holly Robinson Peete) – Mark's roommate, who originally worked for the firm Toplyn and Toplyn, and then worked various odd jobs after quitting Toplyn, before settling on working as an Emergency Medical Technician (which she would later be laid off from), was the daughter of rich parents who later cut her off from her trust fund due to her extravagant spending; would later date Mark (after he successfully conspired to break up her latest relationship due to his jealousies over her boyfriend) and then be engaged to him by the end of season four
Robin Dumars (Dawnn Lewis) – Mark's best friend since childhood who comes up with the idea to have Mark move in with her and Vanessa in order to pay the rent; worked as a music teacher and often moonlighted as a tutor to neighborhood kids (Season 1)
Pamela Jane "P.J." Moore (Nell Carter) – Principal of Oakbridge High during seasons two and three, who was Mark's sister's best friend and his babysitter as a young kid; though it seemed to Mark that P.J. was tough on him, it was revealed later in season three that she was tough on him because she saw the potential in him to be a great teacher (Seasons 2–3)
Geneva Lee (Sandra Quarterman) – Mark's cousin from Georgia, who (with her daughter Nicole) moves in with Mark and Vanessa; seemed out of place in California in early episodes; worked as a music teacher and then principal at Oakbridge High (Seasons 2–5)
Nicole Lee (Raven-Symoné) – Mark's precocious preteen cousin, whom Mark thinks of as practically a daughter; develops a friendship with next-door neighbor Tyler Foster (Seasons 2–5)
Earvin Rodman (Omar Gooding) – One of Mark's students and player on the Oakbridge Penguins boys' basketball team; was not a stellar student, but managed to graduate high school; was briefly married to his high school sweetheart; worked as a security guard after graduating high school (Seasons 4–5; recurring Seasons 1–3)
Tyler Foster (Marquise Wilson) – Mark's next-door neighbor, whom Mark saw as an annoyance in the first two seasons and saw as a son in later episodes; was best friends with Nicole Lee after she is introduced; he had a crush on Vanessa, which was referenced to several times, but also was briefly infatuated with Geneva (Seasons 2–5; recurring Season 1)

Recurring
Coach Ricketts (Roger E. Mosley) – Coach of the Oakbridge Penguins boys' basketball team; once served in the Army (Season 1)
Issac (George Lemore) – One of Mark's students in his P.E. class (Seasons 1–2)
Andre Bailis (Christopher Carter) – One of Mark's students and player on the Oakbridge Penguins boys' basketball team (Seasons 1–2)
Thaddeus White (Dominic Hoffman) – Vanessa's boyfriend in season two, who Mark disliked (Season 2)
Bennie (Don Cheadle) – One of Mark's friends, who was not very bright; had a crush on Vanessa (Season 2; appeared in one Season 3 episode portrayed by Ruben Paul)
Chet Corley (Ron Canada) Was briefly named head coach of Oakbridge High boys' basketball team after Mark forfeits the position due to not returning P.J.'s calls about the offer; he leaves to coach a college team and names Mark as his replacement (Season 3)
Eric Thompson (Kristoff St. John) – A doctor, who Vanessa dated during season three but briefly broke up with after finding out he worked at a free clinic, though would get back together with after realizing that her materialism should not get in the way; would later be engaged to Vanessa and the two would move to New Guinea, but Vanessa would break off their engagement and return to Oakland (Season 3; guest star in Season 4)
Steve Warner (Steve White) – One of Mark's friends, who Mark was roommates with in college; worked as a sportswriter for a local newspaper (Season 3)
Ken Anderson (Kevin Jackson) – Geneva's first long-term serious boyfriend since her divorce; was a member of the Army Reserve, but also had a penchant for baking; would propose to Geneva in season five, but both ultimately decided to slow things down (Seasons 3–4; guest star in Season 5)
Miss Simpson (Lorraine Fields) – Worked as one of the teachers at Oakbridge High (Seasons 3–4)
Mr. Morley (Kelly Perine) – Worked as one of the teachers at Oakbridge High (Season 4)
Miss Cosgrove (Gloria Gifford) – Worked as one of the teachers at Oakbridge High (Season 4)
Lydell (Lewis Dix) – One of Mark's friends; would later marry his girlfriend Florence after only 13 weeks of dating (Seasons 4–5)
Young Coach Ricketts (Peter Brost) – As seen in one of Coach Ricketts many Army flashbacks (Season 1)

Synopsis

Season 1
In the first season, Mark Cooper, Vanessa Russell, and Robin Dumars live as roommates in a house that they rent together. Mark, whose room is in the den, had initially moved in with Robin and Vanessa to help them with their rent. Robin is Mark's long time childhood friend and Vanessa is Robin's best friend (and sorority sister) from college. In the pilot episode, Mark gets a job as a substitute science teacher for a high school where Robin also teaches music. Later in the season, he becomes a physical education teacher as well as the high school's basketball coach. In the middle of the season, the original landlord dies and the house is then purchased by the parents of their annoying but well-meaning neighbor, Tyler Foster. After purchasing the house, Tyler's father gives Mark, Robin, and Vanessa one month to vacate. Tyler intervenes and tells his father that he likes the trio and they are then invited to continue living in their home.

After failing to make the NBA in his youth, Mark is invited to try out and briefly play with the Golden State Warriors, but is soon cut from the team after an embarrassing take down from Charles Barkley. His jersey number with the Warriors was # 7.

The pilot episode was filmed on the same set used by the Seavers in the sitcom Growing Pains.

Seasons 2 through 4

The show moved to Friday nights in the second season as part of the TGIF block. It also was remodeled into more of a family-oriented show instead of an adult oriented show as in the first season. In the second-season premiere, Tyler mentioned that Robin had moved and Mark had purchased the house from his parents. The second-season premiere introduces Mark's cousin, Geneva Lee, and her daughter, Nicole, who move in with him and Vanessa. Geneva took over teaching music at Mark's school. Around the time Geneva and Nicole joined the show, Mark's school welcomed a new principal, P.J. Moore (played by Nell Carter), who was Mark's babysitter when he was a child. She was replaced in Season 4 by Geneva after she had accepted a new job in Chicago.

In 1996, Mark proposed to Vanessa in the episode "Will She or Won't She". This episode was a cliffhanger season finale that was aired on May 10, 1996. The following season premiere episode ("The Ring") was not aired until June 21, 1997, more than a year later. Vanessa accepted Mark's proposal in this episode. "The Ring" is the first episode of the fifth and last season of the series.

The entire third season and most of the fourth season's episodes were directed by Mark Linn-Baker, who portrayed Larry Appleton on the hit ABC series Perfect Strangers. Linn-Baker also appeared in a few episodes.

Season 5
The last season was 13 episodes long, half the length of most television seasons, and was aired in the summer when most television shows are in reruns. In addition, this season was aired on Saturday nights—a move away from its traditional Friday-night slot on TGIF.

The series finale ("Getting Personal"), was aired August 30, 1997. In this episode, Vanessa wrote a personal ad in the newspaper and wanted Mark to figure out which ad was hers and to answer it. Mark decided to answer all ads in the paper, tell everyone to look for the man with the rose, and then not wear a rose. Mark figured that Vanessa would be happy enough that Mark answered her ad, would not worry about the rose, and that the other women would not get mad at him because, without a rose, they would not know that Mark is the one who answered their ads. Earvin knew about Mark's plan and decided to go to the restaurant with the rose so that he could get a date with one of the women whose ad Mark had answered. Vanessa and the other women figured out that the same man had answered all their ads. They decided that the man with the rose would be the dead man with the rose. When Earvin showed up, they all got mad at him, thinking he was the one who'd answered their ads. The finale ended with a goodbye from the cast.

While the series finale was viewed in its entirety on ABC affiliates in the Eastern, Central, and Mountain time zones, ABC pre-empted the episode on the West Coast five minutes in to break the news of the death of Princess Diana, and the finale was never rerun on ABC. Other than several complaints from viewers on the West Coast, there was little, if any, controversy, as this episode generally had low ratings and aired on a Saturday. However, the episode eventually aired in syndication.

ABC actually intended to bring back Hangin' with Mr. Cooper and Step By Step to TGIF for the 1996–97 season as mid-season replacements if freshmen series Sabrina the Teenage Witch and/or Clueless were cancelled (Clueless was cancelled by February and was replaced by Step by Step by March, Clueless was picked up by UPN the next season. Sabrina lasted four seasons on ABC before being picked up by The WB in 2000 where it spent its last three seasons. Both shows are now owned by CBS Television Distribution).

The wedding of Mark and Vanessa would have most likely been the sixth-season premiere episode had the show been renewed after season five, as Mark Curry reportedly had wanted the wedding to begin a new season, not a series finale. Hangin' with Mr. Cooper was the only TGIF show cancelled after the 1996–97 season as CBS picked up Step by Step and Family Matters when that network attempted a TGIF-style comedy lineup on Fridays called the "CBS Block Party".

Production
The series was created by Jeff Franklin (who also created one-time lead-in Full House in 1987, of whose cast John Stamos, Mary-Kate and Ashley Olsen made a guest appearance in Mr. Cooper'''s second episode), the series was originally executive produced by Franklin, with Danny Kallis becoming executive producer and showrunner shortly after; Cheryl Gard became the showrunner for season two, before William Bickley and Michael Warren (who created the popular ABC sitcoms Family Matters and Step by Step, which moved to CBS in 1997) became the showrunners by the third season, continuing until the end of the series.

It is also the only videotaped sitcom produced by Bickley-Warren Productions (all other Bickley-Warren-produced comedies, all of which, except for Hangin' with Mr. Cooper and the short-lived WB sitcom Kirk, were produced in conjunction with Miller-Boyett Productions, were shot on film), and is one of only two series executive produced and/or created by Bickley and/or Warren, that Thomas L. Miller and Robert L. Boyett (who also executive produced the three aforementioned shows) did not executive produce.

Theme song and opening sequences
The show had three different theme songs throughout its run. The first season's theme song was performed by the show's stars, Dawnn Lewis, Holly Robinson, and the R&B quartet En Vogue, and was written by Foster and McElroy. Lewis and Robinson perform most of the theme, while En Vogue sings "Cooper" in the chorus. This sequence was styled similarly to a music video. This was the only opening title sequence during the show's to feature two different versions. The version used in most episodes lasted only 32 seconds. However, a couple of episodes used a minute-long version that included an extra stanza that was not included in the short version.

R&B male crooner and Shalamar lead singer Howard Hewett sang the second season theme, which was a remake of Sam & Dave's R&B Top 10 hit "Soul Man." This version was produced by singer Steve Tyrell, who also composed the scene change music used during season two. The opening sequence accompanying the theme during this season featured Mark, Geneva, Nicole and Vanessa in the kitchen getting ready to go to work and school.

Sherwood Ball, Carmen Carter, and Oren Waters performed the third-season theme, which became the main theme song until the series ended. This theme was written by Gary Boren and Steven Chesne, who also composed the music cues to signify scene changes and commercial breaks during the last three seasons and composed the music score of several Miller-Boyett series during the early and mid-1990s. The sequence, created by graphic design firm Creative Tool, featured shots of various places in Oakland in static and regular form with posterized shots of the cast members with clips on the opposite side of the cast members (though clips of Mark Curry are shown on both sides in his part of the sequence).

Alice Cooper was approached in the initial stages of production to create a theme song for the series, but he declined due to scheduling conflicts.

Episodes

SyndicationHangin' with Mr. Cooper went into off-network broadcast syndication (via Telepictures Distribution and Warner Bros. Television Distribution) in the fall of 1996, where it lasted until the fall of 2000 (airing until the fall of 1999 in some markets). From July 2008 to January 2009 it aired on ION Television as part of the network's Laugh Attack hour of American sitcoms, initially running from 5-6PM/ET, then moved an hour later (switching time slots with The Steve Harvey Show).

The series has also aired on cable network TNN from 2000–2002, on Nickelodeon’s teen-oriented television programming block, TEENick from 2001 to 2003, on TV One from 2007 to 2008, and on BET from 2004 to 2014. The sitcom was picked up by Nick at Nite on January 13, 2014 during the 6:00AM–7:00AM morning line-up), and that same year it returned to Nick Jr. as part of the block, NickMom. when it was aired from October 15, 2014 to April 11, 2015

On September 29, 2017, Hulu acquired the streaming rights to Hangin' with Mr. Cooper along with fellow Warner Bros. TV properties Family Matters, Full House, Perfect Strangers and Step by Step in addition to Disney-ABC TV properties Boy Meets World, Dinosaurs and Home Improvement.

On November 1, 2021, Hangin' with Mr. Cooper began streaming on HBO Max after its streaming rights expired from Hulu.

Home media
On August 2, 2016, Warner Bros. released Hangin' with Mr. Cooper- The Complete First Season'' on DVD via their Warner Archive Collection burn-on-demand service. The second season was released on March 5, 2019, via WBShop.com.

References

External links

 
 

1990s American black sitcoms
1990s American sitcoms
1992 American television series debuts
1997 American television series endings
American Broadcasting Company original programming
English-language television shows
Television series by Warner Bros. Television Studios
Television shows set in Oakland, California
TGIF (TV programming block)
Television series by Lorimar Television